Transmissible spongiform encephalopathies (TSEs) are a group of progressive and fatal conditions that are associated with prions and affect the brain and nervous system of many animals, including humans, cattle, and sheep. According to the most widespread hypothesis, they are transmitted by prions, though some other data suggest an involvement of a Spiroplasma infection. Mental and physical abilities deteriorate and many tiny holes appear in the cortex causing it to appear like a sponge when brain tissue obtained at autopsy is examined under a microscope. The disorders cause impairment of brain function, including memory changes, personality changes and problems with movement that worsen chronically.

TSEs of humans include Creutzfeldt–Jakob disease, Gerstmann–Sträussler–Scheinker syndrome, fatal familial insomnia, and kuru, as well as the recently discovered variably protease-sensitive prionopathy and familial spongiform encephalopathy.  Creutzfeldt-Jakob disease itself has four main forms, the sporadic (sCJD), the hereditary/familial (fCJD), the iatrogenic (iCJD) and the variant form (vCJD). These conditions form a spectrum of diseases with overlapping signs and symptoms.

TSEs in non-human mammals include scrapie in sheep, bovine spongiform encephalopathy (BSE) in cattle – popularly known as "mad cow disease" – and chronic wasting disease (CWD) in deer and elk. The variant form of Creutzfeldt–Jakob disease in humans is caused by exposure to bovine spongiform encephalopathy prions.

Unlike other kinds of infectious disease, which are spread by agents with a DNA or RNA genome (such as virus or bacteria), the infectious agent in TSEs is believed to be a prion, thus being composed solely of protein material. Misshapened prion proteins carry the disease between individuals and cause deterioration of the brain. TSEs are unique diseases in that their aetiology may be genetic, sporadic, or infectious via ingestion of infected foodstuffs and via iatrogenic means (e.g., blood transfusion). Most TSEs are sporadic and occur in an animal with no prion protein mutation. Inherited TSE occurs in animals carrying a rare mutant prion allele, which expresses prion proteins that contort by themselves into the disease-causing conformation. Transmission occurs when healthy animals consume tainted tissues from others with the disease. In the 1980s and 1990s, bovine spongiform encephalopathy spread in cattle in an epidemic fashion. This occurred because cattle were fed the processed remains of other cattle, a practice now banned in many countries. In turn, consumption (by humans) of bovine-derived foodstuff which contained prion-contaminated tissues resulted in an outbreak of the variant form of Creutzfeldt–Jakob disease in the 1990s and 2000s.

Prions cannot be transmitted through the air, through touching, or most other forms of casual contact. However, they may be transmitted through contact with infected tissue, body fluids, or contaminated medical instruments. Normal sterilization procedures such as boiling or irradiating materials fail to render prions non-infective. However, treatment with strong, almost undiluted bleach and/or sodium hydroxide, or heating to a minimum of 134 °C, does destroy prions.

Classification

Differences in shape between the different prion protein forms are poorly understood.

Features
The degenerative tissue damage caused by human prion diseases (CJD, GSS, and kuru) is characterised by four features: spongiform change (the presence of many small holes), the death of neurons, astrocytosis (abnormal increase in the number of astrocytes due to the destruction of nearby neurons), and amyloid plaque formation. These features are shared with prion diseases in animals, and the recognition of these similarities prompted the first attempts to transmit a human prion disease (kuru) to a primate in 1966, followed by CJD in 1968 and GSS in 1981. These neuropathological features have formed the basis of the histological diagnosis of human prion diseases for many years, although it was recognized that these changes are enormously variable both from case to case and within the central nervous system in individual cases.

The clinical signs in humans vary, but commonly include personality changes, psychiatric problems such as depression, lack of coordination, and/or an unsteady gait (ataxia). Patients also may experience involuntary jerking movements called myoclonus, unusual sensations, insomnia, confusion, or memory problems. In the later stages of the disease, patients have severe mental impairment (dementia) and lose the ability to move or speak.

Early neuropathological reports on human prion diseases suffered from a confusion of nomenclature, in which the significance of the diagnostic feature of spongiform change was occasionally overlooked. The subsequent demonstration that human prion diseases were transmissible reinforced the importance of spongiform change as a diagnostic feature, reflected in the use of the term "spongiform encephalopathy" for this group of disorders.

Prions appear to be most infectious when in direct contact with affected tissues.  For example, Creutzfeldt–Jakob disease has been transmitted to patients taking injections of growth hormone harvested from human pituitary glands, from cadaver dura allografts and from instruments used for brain surgery (Brown, 2000) (prions can survive the "autoclave" sterilization process used for most surgical instruments).  It is also believed that dietary consumption of affected animals can cause prions to accumulate slowly, especially when cannibalism or similar practices allow the proteins to accumulate over more than one generation. An example is kuru, which reached epidemic proportions in the mid-20th century in the Fore people of Papua New Guinea, who used to consume their dead as a funerary ritual. Laws in developed countries now ban the use of rendered ruminant proteins in ruminant feed as a precaution against the spread of prion infection in cattle and other ruminants.

There exists evidence that prion diseases may be transmissible by the airborne route.

Note that not all encephalopathies are caused by prions, as in the cases of PML (caused by the JC virus), CADASIL (caused by abnormal NOTCH3 protein activity), and Krabbe disease (caused by a deficiency of the enzyme galactosylceramidase). Progressive Spongiform Leukoencephalopathy (PSL)—which is a spongiform encephalopathy—is also probably not caused by a prion, although the adulterant that causes it among heroin smokers has not yet been identified. This, combined with the highly variable nature of prion disease pathology, is why a prion disease cannot be diagnosed based solely on a patient's symptoms.

Cause

Genetics

Mutations in the PRNP gene cause prion disease. Familial forms of prion disease are caused by inherited mutations in the PRNP gene. Only a small percentage of all cases of prion disease run in families, however. Most cases of prion disease are sporadic, which means they occur in people without any known risk factors or gene mutations. In rare circumstances, prion diseases also can be transmitted by exposure to prion-contaminated tissues or other biological materials obtained from individuals with prion disease.

The PRNP gene provides the instructions to make a protein called the prion protein (PrP). Under normal circumstances, this protein may be involved in transporting copper into cells. It may also be involved in protecting brain cells and helping them communicate. 24 Point-Mutations in this gene cause cells to produce an abnormal form of the prion protein, known as PrPSc. This abnormal protein builds up in the brain and destroys nerve cells, resulting in the signs and symptoms of prion disease.

Familial forms of prion disease are inherited in an autosomal dominant pattern, which means one copy of the altered gene in each cell is sufficient to cause the disorder. In most cases, an affected person inherits the altered gene from one affected parent.

In some people, familial forms of prion disease are caused by a new mutation in the PRNP gene. Although such people most likely do not have an affected parent, they can pass the genetic change to their children.

Protein-only hypothesis
Protein could be the infectious agent, inducing its own replication by causing conformational change of normal cellular PrPC into PrPSc. Evidence for this hypothesis:
Infectivity titre correlates with PrPSc levels. However, this is disputed.
PrPSc is an isomer of PrPC
Denaturing PrP removes infectivity
PrP-null mice cannot be infected
PrPC depletion in the neural system of mice with established neuroinvasive prion infection reverses early spongeosis and behavioural deficits, halts further disease progression and increases life-span

Multi-component hypothesis

While not containing a nucleic acid genome, prions may be composed of more than just a protein. Purified PrPC appears unable to convert to the infectious PrPSc form, unless other components are added, such as RNA and lipids.  These other components, termed cofactors, may form part of the infectious prion, or they may serve as catalysts for the replication of a protein-only prion.

Viral hypothesis
This hypothesis postulates that an as of yet undiscovered infectious viral agent is the cause of the disease.  Evidence for this hypothesis is as follows:
Incubation time is comparable to a lentivirus
Strain variation of different isolates of PrPSc
An increasing titre of PrPSc as the disease progresses suggests a replicating agent.

Diagnosis

There continues to be a very practical problem with diagnosis of prion diseases, including BSE and CJD. They have an incubation period of months to decades during which there are no symptoms, even though the pathway of converting the normal brain PrP protein into the toxic, disease-related PrPSc form has started. At present, there is virtually no way to detect PrPSc reliably except by examining the brain using neuropathological and immunohistochemical methods after death. Accumulation of the abnormally folded PrPSc  form of the PrP protein is a characteristic of the disease, but it is present at very low levels in easily accessible body fluids like blood or urine. Researchers have tried to develop methods to measure PrPSc, but there are still no fully accepted methods for use in materials such as blood.

In 2010, a team from New York described detection of PrPSc even when initially present at only one part in a hundred billion (10−11) in brain tissue. The method combines amplification with a novel technology called Surround Optical Fiber Immunoassay (SOFIA) and some specific antibodies against PrPSc. After amplifying and then concentrating any PrPSc, the samples are labelled with a fluorescent dye using an antibody for specificity and then finally loaded into a micro-capillary tube. This tube is placed in a specially constructed apparatus so that it is totally surrounded by optical fibres to capture all light emitted once the dye is excited using a laser. The technique allowed detection of PrPSc after many fewer cycles of conversion than others have achieved, substantially reducing the possibility of artefacts, as well as speeding up the assay. The researchers also tested their method on blood samples from apparently healthy sheep that went on to develop scrapie. The animals' brains were analysed once any symptoms became apparent. The researchers could therefore compare results from brain tissue and blood taken once the animals exhibited symptoms of the diseases, with blood obtained earlier in the animals' lives, and from uninfected animals. The results showed very clearly that PrPSc could be detected in the blood of animals long before the symptoms appeared.

Epidemiology
Transmissible spongiform encephalopathies (TSE) are very rare but can reach epidemic proportions. It is very hard to map the spread of the disease due to the difficulty of identifying individual strains of the prions. This means that, if animals at one farm begin to show the disease after an outbreak on a nearby farm, it is very difficult to determine whether it is the same strain affecting both herds—suggesting transmission—or if the second outbreak came from a completely different source.

Classic Creutzfeldt-Jakob disease (CJD) was discovered in 1920. It occurs sporadically over the world but is very rare. It affects about one person per million each year. Typically, the cause is unknown for these cases. It has been found to be passed on genetically in some cases. 250 patients contracted the disease through iatrogenic transmission (from use of contaminated surgical equipment). This was before equipment sterilization was required in 1976, and there have been no other iatrogenic cases since then. In order to prevent the spread of infection, the World Health Organization created a guide to tell health care workers what to do when CJD appears and how to dispose of contaminated equipment. The Centers for Disease Control and Prevention (CDC) have been keeping surveillance on CJD cases, particularly by looking at death certificate information.

Chronic wasting disease (CWD) is a prion disease found in North America in deer and elk. The first case was identified as a fatal wasting syndrome in the 1960s. It was then recognized as a transmissible spongiform encephalopathy in 1978. Surveillance studies showed the endemic of CWD in free-ranging deer and elk spread in northeastern Colorado, southeastern Wyoming and western Nebraska. It was also discovered that CWD may have been present in a proportion of free-ranging animals decades before the initial recognition. In the United States, the discovery of CWD raised concerns about the transmission of this prion disease to humans. Many apparent cases of CJD were suspected transmission of CWD, however the evidence was lacking and not convincing.

In the 1980s and 1990s, bovine spongiform encephalopathy (BSE or "mad cow disease") spread in cattle at an epidemic rate. The total estimated number of cattle infected was approximately 750,000 between 1980 and 1996. This occurred because the cattle were fed processed remains of other cattle. Then human consumption of these infected cattle caused an outbreak of the human form CJD. There was a dramatic decline in BSE when feeding bans were put in place.  On May 20, 2003, the first case of BSE was confirmed in North America. The source could not be clearly identified, but researchers suspect it came from imported BSE-infected cow meat. In the United States, the USDA created safeguards to minimize the risk of BSE exposure to humans.

Variant Creutzfeldt-Jakob disease (vCJD) was discovered in 1996 in England. There is strong evidence to suggest that vCJD was caused by the same prion as bovine spongiform encephalopathy. A total of 231 cases of vCJD have been reported since it was first discovered. These cases have been found in a total of 12 countries with 178 in the United Kingdom, 27 in France, five in Spain, four in Ireland, four in the United States, three in the Netherlands, three in Italy, two in Portugal, two in Canada, and one each in Japan, Saudi Arabia, and Taiwan.

History
In the 5th century BCE, Hippocrates described a disease like TSE in cattle and sheep, which he believed also occurred in man. Publius Flavius Vegetius Renatus records cases of a disease with similar characteristics in the 4th and 5th centuries AD. In 1755, an outbreak of scrapie was discussed in the British House of Commons and may have been present in Britain for some time before that. Although there were unsupported claims in 1759 that the disease was contagious, in general it was thought to be due to inbreeding and countermeasures appeared to be successful. Early-20th-century experiments failed to show transmission of scrapie between animals, until extraordinary measures were taken such as the intra-ocular injection of infected nervous tissue. No direct link between scrapie and disease in man was suspected then or has been found since. TSE was first described in man by Alfons Maria Jakob in 1921. Daniel Carleton Gajdusek's discovery that Kuru was transmitted by cannibalism accompanied by the finding of scrapie-like lesions in the brains of Kuru victims strongly suggested an infectious basis to TSE.  A paradigm shift to a non-nucleic infectious entity was required when the results were validated with an explanation of how a prion protein might transmit spongiform encephalopathy. Not until 1988 was the neuropathology of spongiform encephalopathy properly described in cows. The alarming amplification of BSE in the British cattle herd heightened fear of transmission to humans and reinforced the belief in the infectious nature of TSE. This was confirmed with the identification of a Kuru-like disease, called new variant Creutzfeldt–Jakob disease, in humans exposed to BSE. Although the infectious disease model of TSE has been questioned in favour of a prion transplantation model that explains why cannibalism favours transmission, the search for a viral agent was, as of 2007, being continued in some laboratories.

References

 This entry incorporates public domain text originally from the National Institute of Neurological Disorders and Stroke, National Institutes of Health  and the U.S. National Library of Medicine

External links